Andrew Sylvester Warner (January 12, 1819 – December 26, 1887) was an American politician from New York.

Life
He was born on January 12, 1819, in Vernon, Oneida County, New York, the son of Andrew Warner (c.1791–1843) and Elizabeth C. (Young) Warner (b. c.1796). In 1837, the family removed to a farm in Sandy Creek, in Oswego County. On October 19, 1842, he married Mary Elizabeth Greene (d. 1859), and they had two sons.

He was a Free Soiler in 1848, and joined the Republican Party upon its foundation. He was a member of the New York State Assembly (Oswego Co., 2nd D.) in 1855 and 1856; and of the New York State Senate (21st D.) in 1860 and 1861.

On October 3, 1861, he married Chloe Monroe (1840–1916), and their son was Wilbert Charles Warner MD (1864–1927). He fought in the American Civil war attaining the rank of colonel, but contracted typhoid fever and was discharged.

In 1874, he ran as an Independent for Congress in the 24th District, but was defeated by Republican William H. Baker.

He died on December 26, 1887, in Sandy Creek, New York; and was buried at the Woodlawn Cemetery there.

Sources
 The New York Civil List compiled by Franklin Benjamin Hough, Stephen C. Hutchins and Edgar Albert Werner (1867; pg. 442, 480 and 482)
 Biographical Sketches of the State Officers and Members of the Legislature of the State of New York by William D. Murphy (1861; pg. 124ff)
 Obit and portrait at Local History, Morrisville

External links

1819 births
1887 deaths
Republican Party members of the New York State Assembly
Republican Party New York (state) state senators
People from Vernon, New York
People from Sandy Creek, New York
New York (state) Free Soilers